Bihor Region (Regiunea Bihor) was one of the newly established (in 1950) administrative divisions of the People's Republic of Romania, copied after the Soviet style of territorial organisation.

History
The capital of the region was Oradea, and its territory comprised an area similar to the nowadays Bihor County. In 1952 its name was changed to Oradea, and in 1956 after the dissolution of Arad Region it included raions Ineu, Criș, and Gurahonț of it. In 1960 it was renamed Crișana.

Neighbors
Bihor Region had as neighbors:

1950–1956: East: Cluj Region; South: Arad Region; West: Hungarian People's Republic; North: Baia Mare region.
1956–1968: East: Cluj Region; South: Banat and Hunedoara regions; West: Hungarian People's Republic; North: Baia Mare Region.

Rayons

1950–1956: Oradea, Săcuieni, Marghita, Șimleu, Aleșd, Salonta, Beiuș.
1956–1968: Oradea, Săcuieni, Marghita, Șimleu, Aleșd, Salonta, Beiuș, Criș, Ineu, Gurahonț.

Bihor